The 1995 Furman Paladins football team was an American football team that represented Furman University as a member of the Southern Conference (SoCon) during the 1995 NCAA Division I-AA football season. In their second year under head coach Bobby Johnson, the Paladins compiled an overall record of 6–5, with a mark of 5–3 in conference play, finishing tied for third in the SoCon.

Schedule

References

Furman
Furman Paladins football seasons
Furman Paladins football